Anarchism in Albania was first introduced by the Italian anarchist volunteers who fought during the Albanian revolts against the Ottoman Empire and later opposed the Italian military occupation of the country. Native Albanian anarchists first organised themselves within the rising communist movement during the 1920s, but libertarian tendencies were eventually supplanted by Marxism-Leninism, which became the leading tendency by the 1930s. After World War II, a People's Republic was established by the communists under Enver Hoxha, which briefly implemented socialist self-management before drifting first towards Stalinism then Maoism. When communist rule collapsed, the country went through rapid liberalization which caused an insurrection against the state, leading to renewed anarchist analysis of the situation in Albania and the rise of anarchist sympathies among Albanian migrants abroad.

History
The Albanian National Awakening led to a rise in nationalism that advocated the independence of Albania from the Ottoman Empire, which had culminated in a series of revolts during the early 1910s. During the 1911 insurrection, Albanian rebels found support from a number of Italian volunteers, largely coming from the Italian anarchist movement, who participated in a guerrilla war against the Ottomans, before returning to Italy in the wake of the revolt's suppression. Despite the defeats, by the next year Albania had secured its independence, establishing the constitutional Principality of Albania. In the wake of World War I, there was a period of rising left-wing activity in Italy, during which Italian anarchists organised anti-militarist actions against the Italian occupation of Albania. In July 1920, anarchists led a mutiny of Italian troops in Ancona, which was suppressed, before launching an industrial campaign to prevent war material from being shipped to Albania. The sustained anti-militarist campaigns eventually forced the Italian army to withdraw from Albania in August 1920, restoring the independence of the Principality.

The Albanian socialist movement subsequently sprouted up during the early 1920s, when the first strikes started to break out in southern cities. Socialists participated in the June Revolution against Ahmet Zogu, but after the revolt was defeated a number of socialist groups went into exile while others remained active in the country. The socialist groups within Albania largely didn't conform to the party line of the Communist International, with the communist group in Korçë coming under the influence of classical Marxists and anarcho-communists from Thessaloniki. In 1930, Ali Kelmendi returned from exile to enforce the adoption of Marxism–Leninism by the newly established Communist Party, causing a split within the movement that resulted in the suppression of the previously dominant Trotskyist and anarchist elements.

Following the victory of the National Liberation Movement during World War II, the People's Republic was established as a one-party state, under the rule of Enver Hoxha and the Labour Party. Despite having been constituted on a basis of Marxism-Leninism, the Albanian People's Republic deviated from the practices of the other Eastern Bloc regimes. Like the socialist self-management of neighboring Yugoslavia, Hoxha emphasised a decentralized economic system, restricted state bureaucracy and allowed leniency regarding its production quotas, at times even approaching a form of libertarian Marxism. But in the wake of the Tito–Stalin split, the influence of Stalinism took hold by the early 1950s, with the implementation of forced collectivization, rapid industrialization and the establishment of a secret police. In reaction to De-Stalinization, Albanian deviations from the policies of the Soviet Union culminated in the Albanian–Soviet split, during which the Labour Party took an anti-revisionist line and adopted a form of Maoism, before itself splitting from the People's Republic of China following the rise of Deng Xiaoping. The result of this diplomatic isolation and the pursuit of autarky by Hoxhaist officials resulted in an economic crisis, which led to the fall of communism in 1991 and rapid economic liberalization under the newly-elected Democratic Party.

The collapse of the pyramid schemes that dominated the Albanian economy of the 1990s sparked a civil war, during which dispossessed citizens armed themselves in rebellion against the state and established Salvation Committees to take over the functions of the state where it had collapsed. A journalist from Le Monde reported that: "The atmosphere in Gjirokastër is mad. The popular revolt has transformed itself into total anarchy, there is no police, no State, no rules. The city has become enthusiastic, has brightened up, got involved in the game of rebellion." Insurrectionary anarchists were quick to analyze the potential of the situation, which they believed could catalyze into a generalized insurrection against capitalism and the state. But the conflict subsided following foreign intervention and the subsequent election of the Socialist Party to power.

Around the time of the civil war, some migrants that left the country became involved with anarchist groups in Italy and Greece.

Notes

References

Bibliography

Further reading

External links
 Albania topic - Libcom.org
 Albania topic - The Anarchist Library

 
Albania
Anarchism